Carex karlongensis is a tussock-forming perennial in the family Cyperaceae. It is native to parts of China.

See also
 List of Carex species

References

karlongensis
Plants described in 1929
Taxa named by Georg Kükenthal
Flora of China